Natalia Magdalena Janoszek (born June 15, 1990, in Bielsko-Biała) is a Polish actress, film producer, singer and representative of Poland in international beauty contests. She is the winner of the 2018 and 2019 Jharkhand International Film Festival Awards (JIFFA). She made her debut as Aafreen in the Bollywood production Dreamz.

Early life 
Natalia was born in 1990 in Bielsko-Biala, Poland where she completed her early education. After school, she did an international Business Program at the University of Warsaw. From the age of three, she was associated with the "Beskid" Song and Dance Ensemble, and then with the "Bielsko" group, with which she represented Poland at various international festivals. She also attended a Polish Theater in Bielsko. She graduated from Lee Strasberg Theatre and Film Institute and completed her MA in International Business Program at the Faculty of Management at the University of Warsaw.

Career 
At the age of 16, she got the opportunity to take part in the regional contest Miss Poland Teen. Since then, she has represented Poland in 40 international beauty contests, including Miss Peace International 2009, Miss Ocean International 2011, Supermodel International 2012, Swimsuit USA 2012, Tropic Beauty 2013 and Miss Bikini Universe 2013.

She was spotted at Supermodel International 2012 in Bangkok and that same year she made her Bollywood debut with the lead role in Dreamz. In 2014, she appeared in the movie Flame: An Untold Love Story and later in 2015, she starred in the American documentary The Green Fairy opposite Linda Blair. She played the main lead and co-starred with Ashutosh Rana in the 2019 film Chicken Curry Law. She also starred in the American comedy The Swing of Things opposite Luke Wilson the same year. She won JIFFA award twice in a row for the best international actress (2018 and 2019), thus becoming the first Polish actress awarded with an Indian film award.

In 2016, the Helioon Publishing Group released her first book, Behind the Scenes of Bollywood, in which she described her own career in India.

On December 31, 2018, during the New Year's Eve concert in Zakopane, organized by Telewizja Polska, she made her debut as a singer by singing a new version of the song by Snap! "Rhythm is a Dancer".

She is active in charity, she participated, among others, in the WWF ocean protection project or the UNICEF campaign supporting the struggle for women's rights in India and the development of education Jamaica. She gained international recognition with her performance at the opening ceremony of the 72nd Cannes Film Festival.

References 

Living people
1990 births
Polish actresses
Polish models
People from Bielsko-Biała